The Defence Dental Service (DDS) is a tri-service dental services provider to the British Armed Forces.

The service forms part of the MoD Defence Medical Services branch and employs approximately 9,100 personnel drawn from the Royal Navy, British Army and Royal Air Force as well as civilian staff. The service is headquartered at DMS Whittington, near Lichfield in Staffordshire. DDS controls 12 regional headquarters, each headed by a Principle Dental Officer and provides dental services to personnel on active operations throughout the world.

References

External links
DDS hygiene programs and qualifications. From the General Dental Council.

Dental organisations based in the United Kingdom
Health in Staffordshire
Lichfield District
Medical units and formations of the United Kingdom
Military history of Staffordshire
Organisations based in Staffordshire